Actinodium cunninghamii, commonly known as swamp daisy or Albany daisy, is the only formally described species in the genus of flowering plants in the family Myrtaceae, Actinodium and is endemic to Western Australia.

Description
The flowers are borne in pinkish-brown, daisy-like heads  in diameter. The heads are made up of tiny, bell-shaped flowers surrounded by sterile, strap-like ray flowers.

A related, but as yet undescribed species presently given the name Actinodium sp. This species is more common than A. cunninghamii.

Taxonomy
The genus Actinodium was first formally described in 1836 by Johannes Conrad Schauer in the journal Linnaea, Ein Journal für die Botanik in ihrem ganzen Umfange and Schauer later described Actinodium cunninghamii in John Lindley's A Natural System of Botany from specimens collected by Allan Cunningham. The genus name is derived from Greek and means "like the spokes of a wheel".

Distribution and habitat
Actinodium cunninghamii grows in moist, sandy soil in forest and kwongan and is uncommon in nature. Both species of Actinodium usually grow in winter-wet depressions in near-coastal areas near Albany in the south-west of Western Australia.

Use in horticulture
Actinodium sp. 'Fitgerald River' (sometimes as A. cunninghamii) has been grown in gardens but is a short-lived plant requiring good drainage and a sheltered position. It can be propagated from cuttings.

Cultural references
An image of A. cunninghamii was engraved for an Australian Stamp in 1985.

References

Rosids of Western Australia
Monotypic Myrtaceae genera
Myrtales of Australia
Myrtaceae
Plants described in 1836
Taxa named by Johannes Conrad Schauer
Endemic flora of Southwest Australia